The Cesarewitch is a greyhound racing competition held annually at Mullingar Greyhound Stadium in Ballinderry, Mullingar, County Westmeath, Ireland.  

It was inaugurated as an Irish classic competition at the Boyne Valley Greyhound Stadium in Navan and took place over 600 yards from 1960 to 1998. However following the closure of the Navan track it switched to Mullingar over the same race distance.

Past winners

+No SP due to COVID-19 pandemic restrictions

Venues & distances 
1960–1998 	(Navan 600y) 
2001–present 	(Mullingar 600y)

Sponsors
1989–1993 (Navan Track Bookmakers)
1994–1996 (Red Mills)
1997–1998 (Bar One)
2001–2005 (Red Mills)
2006–2016 (Gain Feeds)
2017–2017 (Wallace & Murray)
2018–2018 (All Pet Supplies)
2019–2019 (Larry Clancy Memorial)
2021–2021 (SIS (Sports Information Services))
2022–present (Racing Post GTV)

References

Greyhound racing competitions in Ireland
Sport in County Meath
Recurring sporting events established in 1960
Sport in County Westmeath